Coleophora surniella is a moth of the family Coleophoridae. It is found in the Arabian Peninsula and has a wingspan of 9 mm. Its head, thorax, and abdomen are a uniform brown colour.

References

surniella
Moths described in 1990